Greenock is a census-designated place (CDP) in Elizabeth Township, Allegheny County, Pennsylvania, United States.  As of the 2020 US Census the population was 1,989.

The community was named after Greenock, Scotland.

Demographics

References

Census-designated places in Allegheny County, Pennsylvania
Census-designated places in Pennsylvania